Coreoperca herzi is a species of Coreoperca native only in the fresh waters of South Korea. It usually habits in the upper reaches of rivers, which contain much water and gravel.

Genus 
The members of the genus Coreoperca are known as the oriental perches or eastern perches, freshwater gamefish belonging to the family Percichthyidae. These fish prefer clear, slow-moving currents on the middle reaches of rivers. Eggs are laid in May and June on plants. The eggs and fry are protected by the male.

Etymology 
The word "Coreoperca" is based in Greek roots. The prefix kore(-es) stands for pupil or maid, and suffix perke stands for the perch family.

Coreoperca Herzi has a Korean name, "Ggukji"(꺽지). In Korea, its name was originated from Cheolwon (Gangwon-do) legends. In the period of Joseon Dynasty, an infamous thief called "Lim Ggeokjung" was chased by the government army. He dived into the river and became a fish, which is Coreoperca Herzi. Because he usually wore leopard spotted clothes when he robbed other areas, people considered the spotted pattern of the species as the reshape of Lim. Because Lim's first name starts with "Gguk", and with the Korean suffix "ji", it became "Ggukji".

Biology 
The species Coreoperca Herzi is found only in South Korean fresh waters, mostly in the rivers. The species is very common, so they exist in almost every rivers in Korea. At first, the species did not live on the eastern side of the Paektu Mountains, only on the western side. However, the species were moved artificially in order to flourish also in the waters of west Korea. It can be considered as disturbing species, but its effects are minimal. They usually habit between the rocks and pebbles which they can breed on.

Physical characteristics 
The fish's body is flat to the side, and is high vertically, which is pyramid-shaped. Its body length is from 15 to 20 centimeters(6~8 inches). It has a relatively bigger head compared to its body, and has eyes on the top of its head. Its mouth is big and sharp at the end, and its upper chin is slightly longer than the lower one. The fins on the back has a long, round end, and the tail has a round edge.

It has a greenish-brown background color, and it becomes darker from the abdomen to its tail. It has black dotted stripes throughout the whole body, and the other parts are covered with white dots. Also, it has a sharp, turquoise pattern on the back end of the operculum of its gills. Its color and the brightness changes by the environment, mood and the surrounding light. The shape is similar to a leopard mandarin fish, so people in Korea also call it as a 'mini mandarin fish'.

Behaviour

Feeding behaviour 
Coreoperca Herzi is carnivorous. It feeds on crustaceans, little fish, and aquatic insects.

Sexual behaviour 
It spawns in early summer, in May or June. The appropriate temperature of its mating is 18~28 degrees Celsius. The female species lays and attaches the eggs under a rock, and the male species come and fertilizes it. (External fertilization) After a couple of weeks, and around 20 degrees Celsius, the eggs start to hatch. Like the stickleback fish, the male species protects the eggs from other creatures and supplies oxygen to the unhatched eggs by fanning its fins. It also takes care of the offspring until it grows to a certain size. Before it hatches, some fish such as the striped shinner also lay eggs on the original eggs. However, it does not harm the original eggs and the offspring.

Specific habitats

Regions 
Goseong, Changjin, Cheorwon, Yangju, Yeoju, Chuncheon, Yanggu, Hwacheon, Inje, Pyeonchang, Jungsun, Muju, Jinan, Jeonju, Wanju, Jangsung, Seungju, Suncheon, Miryang, Andong, Bonghwa, Yeongok, Munsan, Paldang, Sancheong, Jinju

References 

Sinipercidae
Taxa named by Solomon Herzenstein
Fish described in 1896